The Cabinet of the state of Manipur, India, forms the executives branch of the Government of Manipur.

This is a list of minister from N. Biren Singh  cabinets starting from 15 March 2017. N. Biren Singh  is the leader of BJP, who was sworn in the Chief Ministers of Manipur on 15 March 2017. Here is the list of the ministers of his ministry.

Council of Ministers

Former Members

See also 
 Government of Manipur
 Directorate of Language Planning and Implementation
 Manipur Legislative Assembly
 Second Biren Singh ministry

References

Bharatiya Janata Party
Lok Janshakti Party
National People's Party (India)
2017 in Indian politics

Naga People's Front
Manipur ministries
2017 establishments in Manipur
Cabinets established in 2017